The 9th edition of the annual Hypo-Meeting took place on May 28 and May 29, 1983, in Götzis, Austria. The track and field competition featured a decathlon (men) and a heptathlon (women) event.

Men's Decathlon

Schedule

May 25

May 26

Records

Results

Women's Heptathlon

Schedule

May 25

May 26

Records

Results

Notes

References
 Statistics
 1984 Year Ranking Decathlon

1983
Hypo-Meeting
Hypo-Meeting
Hypo-Meeting